Belews Lake is a reservoir in Stokes, Rockingham, Guilford and Forsyth counties of North Carolina, near the towns of Stokesdale and Pine Hall. It was created in 1973 by the Duke Energy corporation as a cooling basin for the corporation's Belews Creek Steam Station, a coal-burning power plant. There are 4 public boat ramps on the lake, with 2 being commissioned by the North Carolina Wildlife Resorces Commission(NCWRC). Piney Bluff is located on the southern part of the lake, in Forsyth County, with entrance on NC Highway 65. Pine Hall Boat Launch is the closest to the plant, located in Stokes County, with the ramp being located on the west-northwest part of the lake, with entrance from Pine Hall Rd. Carolina Marina is located in the northern part of the lake, in Rockingham County, with a fee for use. $10 for a day pass, and $125 for a yearly pass. There is also a store where you can buy boat accessories, snacks, and alcohol like beer and wine. They also have a dry storage for the winter, and a grill that serves burgers and hot dogs. Humphreys Ridge is another one. They too have a grill, and is a lot bigger too. The ramp and grill is located on the eastern side of the lake, in Rockingham County. The power plant can be seen from the ramp.
Cooling water was pumped back and forth between the plant and reservoir until 1986 when the corporation decided to use other methods to dispose of their coal ash waste. From 1974-1986, contaminants such as vanadium, nickel, cobalt, barium, arsenic, were introduced into the lake through the release of contaminated cooling water from the power plant back into the lake. Many scientific studies were undertaken at Belews Lake and their findings, along with those conducted at the Kesterson Reservoir, are fundamental to today's understanding of the ecological risks associated with elevated selenium concentrations in aquatic systems.

Background 

It is held back by a rolled earth dam and a concrete spillway. There is no hydroelectric power generation at this dam, so the lake is not bound by many FERC regulations.

It was formed from Belews Creek, a small tributary of the Dan River. U.S. Route 158 and North Carolina Highway 65, as well as a number of secondary roads provide access to the lake. Boating and water skiing are common on the lake.

Two marinas on the lake include Humphrey's Ridge, which has a grill that serves food, and Carolina Marina, which has a grill, boat sales, and service facilities.

Contamination 
Belews Lake was contaminated with selenium as a result of the repeated release of wastewater generated by the adjacent Duke Energy coal-fired power plant into the lake beginning in 1974. Selenium, when ingested in high concentrations is toxic to animals. Selenium bioaccumulates in both terrestrial and aquatic food chains and in animals found at high trophic levels. Elevated levels of selenium cause reproductive and teratogenic defects in fish populations and also inhibit gill, liver, kidney, heart, and eye function.

The number of species of fish in the main basin of Belews Lake fell from 24 to 6 between 1975 and 2002. One explanation for the decrease in species diversity is the sharp decline in reproduction rates of piscivorous fish, such as largemouth bass and green sunfish, after 1975 following the introduction of selenium rich coal ash sluice into the lake. Another study found that 19 of the 20 original species found in Belews Lake experienced reproductive failure and no offspring successfully survived due to selenium poisoning. The species composition of the lake changed from a mix of fish species at several trophic levels to a near complete dominance by fish at lower trophic levels that consume plankton and were not greatly impacted by selenium bioaccumulation.  Mosquitofish were found to be tolerant of heightened selenium levels and were able to thrive as other fish species were extirpated.

Hundreds of analyses were run at Belews Lake as part of an 1988 study measuring potentially hazardous substances in the lake such as metals, metalloids, and pesticides, in addition to other physiochemical properties, but none were found to be of a level of concern except for selenium. This led the scientists to conclude that selenium was the direct cause of fish kills in the lake. Selenium was found to be the only inorganic element of an elevated concentration among the 16 elements that were measured in a 1985 review.

In 1986, the coal-fired power plant stopped releasing selenium rich wastewater into the lake and instead sent dry ash waste to a landfill for disposal. In the following years, sport fish, like bluegill and largemouth bass, were stocked and were successfully re-established in the lake. Selenium concentrations in the water were measured at less than 1 microgram per liter in 1996 compared to a high of 20 micrograms per liter during the period of selenium loading into the system. Additionally, selenium concentrations in fish tissues were found to be 85-95% lower in 1996 compared with the period of active wastewater loading into the lake. Despite the decrease in selenium concentrations in the water and in fish tissue, reproductive impairment was still observed in fish ten years after the wastewater release was halted. This was due to the tendency selenium has to accumulate in sediments and slowly release back into the food web. The presence of high selenium concentrations in sediments at the bottom of the lake also poses risk for quick reintroduction into the lake's food web if there were a disturbance event like a storm that mobilized the sediments. Other factors extending the time it took the lake to recover was how long it takes the lake to flush out contaminated water because of its long retention time and the low rates of new water inflow both of which helped selenium persist in the lake ecosystem.

Other Ecological Concerns 
In 2011, a species of bass called Alabama bass was illegally introduced to Belews Lake for sportfishing. In 2017, a dramatic decrease in the Largemouth bass population in Belews Lake was observed while the number of invasive Alabama bass rose quickly. There are concerns that smallmouth bass may also be extirpated from the lake because of interbreeding and competition with Alabama Bass. To address this issue, North Carolina officials eliminated catch limits on the number and size of Alabama bass that can be caught from Belews Lake to help mitigate the ecological damage these invasive fish cause. A study undertaken at Lake Norman, another reservoir in North Carolina created by Duke Energy, found the introduction of Alabama bass caused a significant shift in species composition and a decline in Largemouth bass population over ten years that never recovered.

See also
Selenium pollution

References

Protected areas of Stokes County, North Carolina
Protected areas of Rockingham County, North Carolina
Protected areas of Forsyth County, North Carolina
Reservoirs in North Carolina
Bodies of water of Stokes County, North Carolina
Bodies of water of Rockingham County, North Carolina
Bodies of water of Forsyth County, North Carolina